The following is a list of Walsall managers from the founding of Walsall Football Club in 1888 until the present day. The list includes only managers who were in charge permanently and does not include any temporary caretaker managers. The club has been served by 48 different permanently appointed managers, all of them born in the United Kingdom, aside from former Denmark international Jan Sørensen (1997–98).

From 1888 to 1920, the team was selected by a committee whose secretary had the same powers and role as a manager has today. There are ten known secretaries from this period, although there is a gap in the history books from 1901 to 1908. The dates for appointment of these should be taken only as approximate, although the years should be correct. In 1920, as was becoming the norm across all football clubs, Walsall broke from this tradition and appointed player Albert Groves as the club's first official manager.

The club's longest serving and, arguably, most-successful manager is Bill Moore who took charge of 470 matches over two spells from 1957–63 and 1969–72. During his first spell he took the team from languishing towards the bottom of the Third Division South to their highest ever post-war league position of 14th in the Second Division in 1962.

Only five managers have achieved promotion for the club since Bill Moore: Alan Buckley in 1979–80, Tommy Coakley in 1987–88, Chris Nicholl in 1994–95, Ray Graydon in 1998–99 and 2000–01, and Richard Money in 2006–07.

Managers

Only competitive first team matches are counted. Wins, losses and draws are results at the final whistle; the results of penalty shoot-outs are not counted. Correct as of match on 8 May 2021.

Key
sec Secretary-manager.
p Player-manager.
† Served as caretaker manager before being appointed permanently.

Footnotes

References

Managers
 
Walsall